Ihor Chuchman (born 15 February 1985) is a Ukrainian football defender who plays for Irtysh Pavlodar in the Kazakhstan Premier League.

He transferred to Illychivets Mariupol during the 2007–08 winter transfer season from FC Zakarpattia Uzhhorod.

External links 

Profile on Official Zakarpattia Website
Profile on Official Illychivets Website
Profile on Football Squads

1985 births
Living people
Ukrainian footballers
Ukraine youth international footballers
FC Mariupol players
FC Hoverla Uzhhorod players
FC Karpaty Lviv players
Ukrainian Premier League players
Ukrainian First League players
Ukrainian Second League players
Kazakhstan Premier League players
FC Irtysh Pavlodar players
Association football central defenders
Sportspeople from Lviv